John Angelos or Angelus (c. 1193 – 1253), also known as Good John ( / Kaloiōannēs), was a Byzantine prince who migrated to Hungary, and served as governor of various southern regions, including Syrmia, from 1227 until 1253, during the reign of Hungarian kings Andrew II and Béla IV, who were his maternal relatives.

Life
John Angelos was the son of Isaac II Angelos, the Byzantine Emperor from 1185 to 1195, and again from 1203 to 1204; and Margaret of Hungary, the daughter of King Béla III (r. 1172–1196) and sister of King Emeric (r. 1196–1204). John had three older half-siblings from his father's first marriage: Anna-Euphrosyne, Irene Angelina and Alexios IV Angelos, while he had a younger full brother, Manuel Angelos (b. after 1195 – d. 1212).

The family found refuge in the Hungarian court in 1222.

King Andrew II of Hungary (r. 1205–1235), his uncle, gave him "Syrmia and beyond", i.e. south of the Sava river, including Belgrade and Macsó, which he ruled until 1253.

In 1221, Pope Honorius III demanded that the "heretics" (Bogomils) be exterminated in Bosnia. His chaplain Aconcio was unable to gain any followers in Ragusa, and died while in Bosnia. Ugrin Csák, the Archbishop of Kalocsa, proposed to Andrew II of Hungary that he would lead the Bosnian Crusade, and the king and pope promised him all lands that he would clear of heretics. Ugrin overrated himself, and instead gave 200 silver marks to John Angelos, the ruler of Syrmia, to perform the task. John took the money but never acted against the Bogomils, despite being reminded of his obligation by Pope Honorius III in 1227.

King Béla IV appointed John Angelos as the governor of Syrmia, and Rostislav Mikhailovich as the governor of Slavonia, securing his southern boundaries while heading towards the Adriatic. Another source claims that he ruled Syrmia and Bačka from ca. 1230.

He died by 1253, since documents related to marriage of his daughter Maria mention him as deceased.

Issue
John was married to Matilda of Vianden (ca. 1216–), daughter of Henry I, Count of Vianden and Margaret Courtenay, Matilda's mother Margaret was daughter of Peter Courtenay, Latin emperor of Constantinople, and thus sister of Latin emperors Robert and Baldwin II. 

Their daughter Maria was married to "Anselm of Keu". Their marriage licenses were issued in 1253 and 1254, by the papal chancellery. The first document mentions the marriage "inter Anselmum de Keu ac Mariam, natam Matildis dominae de Posaga, natae comitissae Viennensis", while the second document mentions "Maria, nate quondam Calojohanni" and also mentions Maria's maternal uncle as "imperatore Constantinopolitano, eiusdem Matildis avunculo". Those data allowed Gordon McDaniel to identify Maria's father as John Angelos, lord of Syrmia, and Maria's mother as Matilda, daughter of Henry I, Count of Vianden and Margaret Courtenay (sister of the Latin emperors Robert and Baldwin II).

Identity of Maria's husband was a subject of several genealogical and historical studies, that tried to resolve complex questions related to attribution of sources on at least two persons (father and son) who had the same name: Anseau de Cayeux.

Gordon McDaniel proposed that Maria, daughter of John Angelos, is the same person as Maria, who is mentioned in several sources from the 1270s and 1280s as widow of Anseau de Cayeux, and also as sister of queen Jelena of Serbia. Based on that assumption, he concluded that Jelena's father was John Angelos of Syrmia.

In the summer of 1280, king Charles I of Sicily issued a document, allowing lady Maria to travel from Apulia to Serbia, to visit her sister, the queen of Serbia. In later documents, issued in 1281, Maria was mentioned by king Charles as his cousin, and widow of Anselm "de Chau".

If those assumptions are correct, John Angelos would be maternal grandfather of Serbian kings Stefan Dragutin and Stefan Milutin.

Ancestors

References

Sources

 
 
 
 
 
 
 
 
 
 
 
 
 
 

Dukes of Macsó
Angelid dynasty
Greek expatriates in Hungary
13th-century Byzantine people
13th-century Hungarian people
13th-century rulers in Europe
13th century in Serbia
1193 births
1259 deaths
Year of birth uncertain
History of Syrmia
Medieval history of Vojvodina
Sons of Byzantine emperors